Nino Sutidze (born 27 March 1992) is a Georgian women's football defender. She played in the Turkish Women's First Football League for Ataşehir Belediyespor with jersey number 71. She is a member of the Georgia women's national football team since 2011.

Playing career

Club

Nino Sutidze began her football career with FC Iveria Khashuri in Khashuri, Georgia. In the summer of 2008, she transferred to the senior team of FC Norchi Dinamo Tbilisi. In her first season, she won Georgia women's football championship 2008–09, and took part at the 2009–10 UEFA Women's Champions League – Group A matches. She played in all the three group matches until her team's elimination. After two seasons, Sutidze moved to FC Baia Zugdidi, and enjoyed in the 2009–10 season her second championship.

On 2 December 2011 she was transferred by the Turkish club Konak Belediyespor. With the team from Izmir, she enjoyed Turkish Women's First Football League championship in 2013. She participated at the 2013–14 UEFA Women's Champions League and played in four matches of the seven until the quarterfinals.

In the beginning of the 2013–14 season's second half, Konak Belediyespor suspended her license in order to be able to deploy her newly transferred countrywoman Tatiana Matveeva in addition to their two other foreign players, the Romanians Cosmina Dușa and Raluca Sârghe. Women's football teams in Turkey may have not more than three foreigners in their squad.

In the 2014–15 season, she transferred to Adana İdmanyurduspor playing the half season only. In the second half of the 2014–15 season, she moved to Karşıyaka BESEM Spor in Izmir. In the beginning of the 2015–16 season, Sutidze returned her former club Konak Belediyespor. She  joined the Istanbul-based Ataşehir Belediyespor in the 2016–18 season. She transferred to the Georgian club WFC NIKE in the 2019 season. After 2019 season she joined Georgian Club FC Kvartali where she played for 2 seasons.

International
Nino Sutidze made her debut in the Georgian women's national team on 3 March 2011, playing at the UEFA Women's Euro 2013 qualifying round match against Malta.

Post-playing career 
Nino Sutidze became analyst at Georgian women's national team in the 2022.

Career statistics
.

Honours 
Georgian women's  player of the year in 2017 and 2021 
 Georgia women's football championship
 FC Norchi Dinamo Tbilisi
 Winners (1): 2008–09.

 FC Baia Zugdidi
 Winners (1): 2009–10.

 Turkish Women's First League
 Konak Belediyespor
 Winners (3): 2012–13, 2013–14, 2015–16

 Ataşehir Belediyespor
 Winners (1): 2017–18
 Third places (1): 2016–17

References

External links

Living people
1992 births
People from Racha-Lechkhumi and Kvemo Svaneti
Women's footballers from Georgia (country)
Women's association football defenders
Georgia (country) women's international footballers
Expatriate women's footballers from Georgia (country)
Expatriate women's footballers in Turkey
Konak Belediyespor players
Adana İdmanyurduspor players
Karşıyaka BESEM Spor players
Ataşehir Belediyespor players
Expatriate sportspeople from Georgia (country) in Turkey